Hideo Saito may refer to:
Hideo Saito (musician) (1902–1974)
Hideo Saitō (musician, born 1958)
Hideo Saito, one of the ring names of professional wrestler Mitsuhide Hirasawa, a.k.a. Captain New Japan